Karol Machata (13 January 1928 – 3 May 2016) was a Slovak actor. He appeared in more than 40 films and television shows between 1951 and 1992. He was inducted into the Hall of Fame at the 8th OTO Awards in 2007.

Selected filmography
 St. Peter's Umbrella (1958)
 A Song About the Gray Pigeon (1961)

References

External links

1928 births
2016 deaths
Slovak male film actors
People from Malacky